The Madison Parish School Board is an entity responsible for the operation of public schools in Madison Parish, Louisiana, United States. It is headquartered in the city of Tallulah.

Schools

Secondary schools
Grades 9-12
Madison High School  (Tallulah) (Jaguars)
Grades 6-8
Madison Middle School (Tallulah)

Primary schools
Grades PK-5
Tallulah Elementary School (Tallulah)
Wright Elementary School (Tallulah)

Other Campuses
Grades 6-12
Christian Acres Alternative School (Unincorporated area)

Demographics
Total Students (as of October 1, 2007): 2,183
Gender
Male: 51%
Female: 49%
Race/Ethnicity
African American: 91.85%
White: 6.96%
Hispanic: 0.87%
Asian: 0.32%
Socio-Economic Indicators
At-Risk: 87.91%
Free Lunch: 84.61%
Reduced Lunch: 3.30%

See also
List of school districts in Louisiana

References

External links
Madison Parish School Board - Official site.

School districts in Louisiana
Education in Madison Parish, Louisiana